Tara Vs Bilal is a 2022 Indian Hindi-language romantic comedy film directed by Samar Iqbal, starring Harshvardhan Rane and Sonia Rathee. The story revolves around two leading characters who enter a fake marriage and later fall in love.

Tara Vs Bilal was released on 28 October 2022.

Cast 
 Harshvardhan Rane as Advocate Bilal "Billu" Khan
 Sonia Rathee as Tara Kaul Sharma Khan

Soundtrack 

The music was composed and lyrics written by Manan Bhardwaj.

Production 
The principal photography of the film started in mid-October 2021.

References

External links
 

Indian romantic comedy-drama films
2022 films
2020s Hindi-language films